Stanisław Świętochowski (4 August 1899 – 25 December 1940) was a Polish sprinter. He competed in the men's 400 metres at the 1924 Summer Olympics. He was killed during World War II.

References

External links
 

1899 births
1940 deaths
Athletes (track and field) at the 1924 Summer Olympics
Polish male sprinters
Olympic athletes of Poland
Place of birth missing
Polish military personnel killed in World War II
Polish people executed by the Soviet Union
20th-century Polish people